Myrmapana is a genus of spiders in the family Salticidae. It was first described in 2016 by Prószyński. , it contains 5 species, found in the Americas from Mexico to Brazil.

References

Salticidae
Salticidae genera
Spiders of North America
Spiders of South America